The Bridgeport Subdivision is a railroad line owned and operated by CSX Transportation in the U.S. state of West Virginia. The line runs from Grafton west to Clarksburg along a former Baltimore and Ohio Rail Road line. At its east end, the Bridgeport Subdivision becomes the Mountain Subdivision; its west end is at the Short Line Subdivision.

History
The Bridgeport Subdivision opened in 1857 as part of the Northwestern Virginia Railroad and was immediately leased by the B&O. It changed hands to CSX through mergers.

References

CSX Transportation lines
Rail infrastructure in West Virginia
Baltimore and Ohio Railroad lines